Phala is a Sanskrit term that means “fruit” of one's actions in Hinduism and Buddhism. In Buddhism, the following types of phala are identified:
 Ariya-phala also refers to the fruition of following the Buddhist path.
 Maha-phala refers the great fruits of the contemplative life.

Within Hinduism
In Hinduism, the term phala is translated as fruition, results, effects.

The Yoga-Sûtra of Patañjali (verse 2.36) states:
 As truthfulness (satya) is achieved, the fruits of actions naturally result according to the will of the Yogi. (satya pratisthayam kriya phala ashrayatvam)

Within Buddhism
Within Buddhism, the term phala is used to refer to the fruition or results of actions according to the doctrine of karmic action and result.

Alternate translations
The term phala is translated as:
 fruit (Harvey, 1990, p. 39; Keown, 2000, loc 810-813)
 fruition
 effect (Ven. D. Mahinda Thera)

Ariya-phala
The term Ariya phala is used to refer specifically to the fruition of following the Buddhist path. The fruition for each of the four levels of the path is identified as follows:
 Sota patti phala, fruition of stream entry 
 Sakadagamiphala, fruition of once returning
 Anagami phala, fruition of non returning    
 Arahatta phala, fruition of the worthy one  or perfected one

Maha-phala
The term Maha-phala refers to the ten "Great fruits" of the contemplative life. According to the Samaññaphala Sutta, the 10 “Great fruits” (DN 2) are:
 Equanimity (upekkha)
 Fearlessness (nibbhaya)
 Freedom from unhappiness & suffering (Asukhacaadukkha)
 Meditative Absorption (jhana/samādhi)
 Out-of-body experience  (Manomaya)
 Clairaudience (dibba-sota)
 Intuition and mental telepathy (ceto-pariya-ñána)
 Recollection of past lives (Patisandhi)
 Clairvoyance (dibba-cakkhu)
 End of anxiety & mental agitation (nirvāna)

Comparison to Christianity
The fruit (phala) of Buddhism and Hinduism are comparable the charisms of Charismatic Christianity which are known as the "sign-gifts” of the Holy Spirit, which are the charisms of prophesy, healing, and speaking in tongues, as described in St Paul's Epistle, 1 Corinthians, Chapters 12 and 14 and elsewhere.

References

Sources

 
 
 
 
 

Hindu philosophical concepts
Buddhist philosophical concepts
Karma in Buddhism